United Front Games, Inc. was a Canadian video game development studio based in Vancouver. They created titles for the PlayStation 3, PlayStation 4, PlayStation Portable, PlayStation Vita, Xbox 360, Xbox One, and Microsoft Windows. They are the developers of ModNation Racers and the critical and commercial success Sleeping Dogs in addition to collaborating with other studios on projects like Tomb Raider: Definitive Edition (Crystal Dynamics) and Halo: The Master Chief Collection (343 Industries).

Created in 2007, the studio consisted of former members of EA Black Box, Rockstar Vancouver, Radical Entertainment and Volition, all of which made video games with an open world setting. In 2016, United Front Games officially closed down.

History
United Front Games was founded in 2007. Its first official title was ModNation Racers, a user-generated content kart racing game, which began production in 2008 and was released in May 2010. In August 2012, they released Sleeping Dogs (previously known as True Crime: Hong Kong). While it is widely believed that Sleeping Dogs was originally conceived as a title in the True Crime series, it was in fact built from the ground up as an original intellectual property. United Front Games also made LittleBigPlanet Karting with help from the series creators Media Molecule.

United Front Games also worked on the Xbox One version of Tomb Raider: Definitive Edition.

In early 2013, United Front began production on a sequel to Sleeping Dogs. Plans for the sequel were eventually scrapped in late 2013 before the project even went into production.

In October 2014, United Front released Sleeping Dogs for the PlayStation 4 and Xbox One called Sleeping Dogs: Definitive Edition. In September 2014, United Front Games announced Triad Wars, an online open world action-adventure game. Originally targeted for an early 2015 release on PC, Triad Wars was  game set in the Sleeping Dogs Hong Kong universe. However, in December 2015 United Front announced the January 2016 closure of the Triad Wars open beta. 
In collaboration with Microsoft Studios' owned developer, 343 Industries, United Front Games developed the Halo: The Master Chief Collection compilation, published in November 2014.

On October 17, 2016, United Front Games announced closure even though their newest game Smash+Grab, an online multiplayer brawler, had only been out for less than a month on Steam Early Access. No further details were given by the studio regarding its closure.

Games developed

References

External links

Video game development companies
Defunct companies of British Columbia
Companies based in Vancouver
Canadian companies established in 2007
Video game companies established in 2007
Video game companies disestablished in 2016
Defunct video game companies of Canada
2007 establishments in British Columbia
2016 disestablishments in British Columbia